The Price of Progression may refer to:

 The Price of Progression (The Toll album), 1988
 The Price of Progression (Ensign album), 2001